MV Norse Variant was a Norwegian combined bulk and car carrier, which sank off the coast of New Jersey during a storm on 22 March 1973.

Ship history
The ship was constructed by the Uddevallavarvet AB shipyard at Uddevalla, Sweden, for Odd Godager & Co. of Oslo, and was delivered in March 1965. Norse Variant could carry 1,500 cars and sailed between Europe, the US east and west coasts, and Japan, with cars and bulk cargoes. She sailed from Newport News on 21 March 1973 with a cargo of coal bound for Glasgow and sank in a late winter storm the next day. The last radio message from the ship was received at 13:49 on 22 March. Of the crew of 30 only one man, the oiler Stein Gabrielsen, survived, having spent three days on rafts before being rescued by MT Mobile Lube.

Another Norwegian combined bulk and car carrier, MV Anita, which passed Cape Henry only an hour after Norse Variant, disappeared with its crew of 32. Nothing was ever found of this vessel.

References

Further reading
 
 
 

1964 ships
Bulk carriers
Maritime incidents in 1973
Merchant ships of Norway
Ships built in Sweden
Shipwrecks of the New Jersey coast